Opostegoides epistolaris is a moth of the family Opostegidae. It was described by Edward Meyrick in 1911. It is known from Mysore in India.

Adults have been recorded in May.

References

Opostegidae
Moths described in 1911